JFK (released under the subtitle The Story That Won’t Go Away) is a 1991 American epic political thriller film written and directed by Oliver Stone. The film examines the investigation into the assassination of John F. Kennedy by district attorney Jim Garrison, who came to believe there was a conspiracy to assassinate Kennedy and that Lee Harvey Oswald did not act alone.

The film's screenplay was adapted by Stone and Zachary Sklar from the books On the Trail of the Assassins (1988) by Jim Garrison and Crossfire: The Plot That Killed Kennedy (1989) by Jim Marrs. Stone described this account as a "counter-myth" to the Warren Commission's "fictional myth." JFK became embroiled in controversy at the time of its release. Many major American newspapers ran editorials accusing Stone of taking liberties with historical facts, including the film's implication that Kennedy's Vice President (and eventual successor) Lyndon B. Johnson was part of a coup d'état to kill Kennedy. 

Despite the controversy, JFK received critical praise for the performances of its cast, Stone's directing, score, editing, and cinematography. The film gradually picked up momentum at the box office after a slow start, earning over $205 million in worldwide gross, making it the sixth highest-grossing film of 1991 worldwide. JFK was nominated for eight Academy Awards, including Best Picture, and won two for Best Cinematography and Best Editing. It was the first of three films Stone made about American presidents, followed by Nixon (1995) and W. (2008).

Plot 
During his farewell address in 1961, outgoing President Dwight D. Eisenhower warns about the build-up of the military-industrial complex. He is succeeded by John F. Kennedy as president, whose time in office is marked by the Bay of Pigs Invasion and the Cuban Missile Crisis until his assassination in Dealey Plaza, Dallas, Texas, on November 22, 1963. Former US marine and suspected Soviet defector Lee Harvey Oswald is arrested for the murder of police officer J. D. Tippit and arraigned with both murders but is killed by nightclub owner Jack Ruby. New Orleans District Attorney Jim Garrison and his team investigate potential New Orleans links to the JFK assassination, including private pilot David Ferrie, but their investigation is publicly rebuked by the federal government and Garrison closes the investigation.

The investigation is reopened in 1966 after Garrison reads the Warren Report and notices what he believes to be multiple inaccuracies. Garrison and his staff interrogate people involved with Oswald and Ferrie. One such witness is Willie O'Keefe, a male prostitute serving five years in prison for solicitation, who says that he witnessed Ferrie talking with a man called "Clay Bertrand" about assassinating Kennedy, and that he briefly met Oswald. Garrison and his team theorize Oswald was an agent of the CIA and was framed for the assassination.

In 1967, Garrison and his team talk to several witnesses, including Jean Hill, a teacher who says she witnessed a gunman shooting from the "grassy knoll", a small hill, that Secret Service threatened her into saying three shots came from the Texas School Book Depository from which Oswald was said to have shot Kennedy, and her testimony was altered by the Warren Commission. Garrison's staff also test fire an empty rifle from the Depository and conclude that Oswald was too poor a marksman to make the shots, and that there was more than one shooter. Garrison comes to believe that "Bertrand" is really New Orleans businessman Clay Shaw. Garrison interviews Shaw, who denies having ever met Ferrie, O'Keefe or Oswald. 

Some key witnesses become scared and refuse to testify while others, such as Ruby and Ferrie, die in suspicious circumstances. Before his death, Ferrie tells Garrison that there was a conspiracy to kill Kennedy. Garrison meets a high-level figure in Washington D.C. who identifies himself as "X". He suggests a coup d'état at the highest levels of government, implicating members of the CIA, the Mafia, the military-industrial complex, Secret Service, FBI, and then-Vice President Lyndon Johnson as either co-conspirators or as having motives to cover up the truth of the assassination. X suggests that Kennedy was killed because he wanted to pull the United States out of the Vietnam War and dismantle the CIA. X encourages Garrison to keep digging and prosecute Shaw. Soon afterward, Garrison indicts Shaw with conspiring to murder Kennedy.

Some of Garrison's staff begin to doubt his motives and disagree with his methods, and leave the investigation. Garrison's marriage is strained when his wife Liz complains that he is spending more time on the case than with his own family. After a sinister phone call is made to their daughter, Liz accuses Garrison of being selfish and attacking Shaw only because of his homosexuality. In addition, Garrison is criticized in the media as wasting taxpayer money to investigate a conspiracy theory. Garrison suspects a connection with the assassination of Martin Luther King Jr. and the assassination of Robert F. Kennedy.

Shaw's trial takes place in 1969. Garrison presents the court with a dismissal of the single-bullet theory, proposing a scenario involving three assassins firing six shots and framing Oswald for the murders of Kennedy and Tippit, all for the purpose of installing Johnson as President so he could escalate the war in Vietnam and enrich the defense industry. However, the jury acquits Shaw after less than one hour of deliberation. While his prosecution has failed, Garrison wins his wife and children's respect for his determination, and so repairs his relationship with his family.

Cast 

 Kevin Costner as Jim Garrison
 Kevin Bacon as Willie O'Keefe
 Tommy Lee Jones as Clay Shaw / Clay Bertrand
 Laurie Metcalf as Susie Cox
 Gary Oldman as Lee Harvey Oswald
 Michael Rooker as Bill Broussard
 Jay O. Sanders as Lou Ivon
 Sissy Spacek as Liz Garrison
 Joe Pesci as David Ferrie
 Beata Poźniak as Marina Oswald Porter 
 Jack Lemmon as Jack Martin
 Walter Matthau as Senator Russell B. Long
 Donald Sutherland as Mr. X
 Ed Asner as Guy Banister
 Brian Doyle-Murray as Jack Ruby
 John Candy as Dean Andrews Jr.
 Sally Kirkland as Rose Cheramie
 Wayne Knight as Numa Bertel
 Pruitt Taylor Vince as Lee Bowers
 Tony Plana as Carlos Bringuier
 Vincent D'Onofrio as Bill Newman
 Dale Dye as General Y
 Lolita Davidovich as Beverly Oliver
 Ellen McElduff as Jean Hill
 John Larroquette as Jerry Johnson
 Willem Oltmans as George de Mohrenschildt
 Tomas Milian as Leopoldo
 Gary Grubbs as Al Oser
 Ron Rifkin as Mr. Goldberg / Spiesel
 Peter Maloney as Colonel Finck
 John Finnegan as Judge Haggerty
 Wayne Tippit as FBI Agent Frank
 Jo Anderson as Julia Ann Mercer
 Bob Gunton as News Anchor
 Frank Whaley as Imposter Oswald 
 Jim Garrison as Earl Warren
 Martin Sheen as Narrator

Production 
Zachary Sklar, a journalist and a professor of journalism at the Columbia School of Journalism, met Garrison in 1987 and helped him rewrite a manuscript that he was working on about Kennedy's assassination. He changed it from a scholarly book in the third person to "a detective story – a whydunnit" in the first person. Sklar edited the book and it was published in 1988. While attending the Latin American Film Festival in Havana, Cuba, Stone met Sheridan Square Press publisher Ellen Ray on an elevator. She had published Jim Garrison's book On the Trail of the Assassins. Ray had gone to New Orleans and worked with Garrison in 1967. She gave Stone a copy of Garrison's book and told him to read it. He did and quickly bought the film rights with $250,000 of his own money to prevent talk going around the studios about projects he might be developing.

Kennedy's assassination had always had a profound effect on Stone: "The Kennedy murder was one of the signal events of the postwar generation, my generation." Stone met Garrison and grilled him with a variety of questions for three hours. Garrison stood up to Stone's questioning and then got up and left. His pride and dignity impressed the director. Stone's impressions from their meeting were that "Garrison made many mistakes. He trusted a lot of weirdos and followed a lot of fake leads. But he went out on a limb, way out. And he kept going, even when he knew he was facing long odds."

Stone was not interested in making a film about Garrison's life, but rather the story behind the conspiracy to kill Kennedy. He also bought the film rights to Jim Marrs' book Crossfire: The Plot That Killed Kennedy. One of the filmmaker's primary goals with JFK was to provide a rebuttal to the Warren Commission's report that he believed was "a great myth. And in order to fight a myth, maybe you have to create another one, a counter-myth." Even though Marrs' book collected many theories, Stone was hungry for more and hired Jane Rusconi, a recent Yale University graduate, to lead a team of researchers and assemble as much information about the assassination as possible while the director completed post-production on Born on the Fourth of July. Stone read two dozen books on the assassination while Rusconi read between 100 and 200 books on the subject.

By December 1989, Stone began approaching studios to back his film. While in pre-production on The Doors, he met with three executives at Warner Bros. who wanted him to make a film about Howard Hughes. However, Warren Beatty owned the rights and so Stone pitched JFK. Studio president and chief operating officer Terry Semel liked the idea. He had a reputation for making political and controversial films, including All the President's Men, The Parallax View and The Killing Fields. Stone made a handshake deal with Warner Bros. whereby the studio would get all the rights to the film and put up $20 million for the budget. The director did this so that the screenplay would not be widely read and bid on, and he also knew that the material was potentially dangerous and wanted only one studio to finance it. Finally, Stone liked Semel's track record of producing political films.

Screenplay 
When Stone set out to write the screenplay, he asked Sklar (who also edited Marrs' book) to co-write it with him and distill the Garrison and Marrs books and Rusconi's research into a script that would resemble what he called "a great detective movie." Stone told Sklar his vision of the film:
 Although he did employ ideas from Rashomon, his principal model for JFK was Z:
 Stone broke the film's structure down into four stories: Garrison investigating the New Orleans connection to the assassination; the research that revealed what Stone calls, "Oswald legend: who he was and how to try to inculcate that"; the recreation of the assassination at Dealey Plaza; and the information that the character of "X" imparts on Garrison, which Stone saw as the "means by which we were able to move between New Orleans, local, into the wider story of Dealey Plaza."

Sklar worked on the Garrison side of the story while Stone added the Oswald story, the events at Dealey Plaza and the "Mr. X" character. Sklar spent a year researching and writing a 550-page triple-spaced screenplay and then Stone rewrote it and condensed it closer to normal screenplay length. Stone and Sklar used composite characters, most notably the "Mr. X" character played by Donald Sutherland. This was a technique that would be criticized in the press. He was a mix of Richard Case Nagell and retired Air Force colonel Fletcher Prouty, another adviser for the film and who was a military liaison between the CIA and the Pentagon. Meeting Prouty was, for Stone, "one of the most extraordinary afternoons I've ever spent. Pretty much like in the movie, he just started to talk." According to Stone: 

The screenplay's early drafts suggested a four and a half-hour film with a potential budget of $40 million – double what Stone had agreed to with Warner Bros. The director knew film mogul Arnon Milchan and met with him to help finance the film. Milchan was eager to work on the project and launch his new company, Regency Enterprises, with a high profile film like JFK. Milchan made a deal with Warner Bros. to put up the money for the film. Stone managed to pare down his initial revision, a 190-page draft, to a 156-page shooting script.

There were many advisers for the film, including Gerald Hemming, a former Marine who claimed involvement in various CIA activities, and Robert Groden, a self-proclaimed photographic expert and longtime JFK assassination researcher and author.

Stone later published JFK: The Documented Screenplay, a heavily annotated version of the screenplay in which he cites sources for nearly every claim made in the film.

Casting 
Trying to cast the role of Garrison, Stone sent copies of the script to Costner, Mel Gibson, and Harrison Ford. Initially, Costner turned Stone down. However, the actor's agent, Michael Ovitz, was a big fan of the project and helped Stone convince the actor to take the role. Before accepting the role, Costner conducted extensive research on Garrison, including meeting the man and his enemies. Two months after finally signing on to play Garrison in January 1991, his film Dances with Wolves won seven Academy Awards and so his presence greatly enhanced JFKs bankability in the studio's eyes.

Tommy Lee Jones was originally considered for another role that was ultimately cut from the film and Stone then decided to cast him as Shaw. In preparation for the film, Jones interviewed Garrison on three different occasions and talked to others who had worked with Shaw and knew him.

Stone originally wanted James Woods to play David Ferrie, but Woods wanted to play Garrison. Stone also approached Willem Dafoe and John Malkovich, who both turned down the role.

Stone considered Marlon Brando for the role of Mr. X.

According to Gary Oldman, very little was written about Oswald in the script. Stone gave him several plane tickets, a list of contacts, and told him to do his own research. Oldman met with Oswald's wife, Marina, and her two daughters to prepare for the role. Beata Poźniak studied 26 volumes of the Warren Report and spent time living with Marina Oswald. Since the script contained few lines for the Oswalds, Poźniak interviewed acquaintances of the Oswalds in order to improvise her scenes with Gary Oldman.

Many actors were willing to waive their normal fees because of the nature of the project and to lend their support. Martin Sheen provided the opening narration. Jim Garrison played Chief Justice Earl Warren, during the scene in which he questions Jack Ruby in a Dallas jail and in a TV appearance. Assassination witness Beverly Oliver, who claims to be the "Babushka Lady" seen in the Zapruder film, also appeared in a cameo in Ruby's club. Sean Stone, Oliver Stone's son, plays Garrison's oldest son Jasper. Perry Russo, one of the sources for the fictional character Willie O'Keefe, appeared in a cameo as an angry bar patron who says Oswald should get a medal for shooting Kennedy.

Principal photography 
The story revolves around Costner's Jim Garrison, with a large cast of well-known actors in supporting roles. Stone was inspired by the casting model of the documentary epic The Longest Day, which he had admired as a child: "It was realistic, but it had a lot of stars ... the supporting cast provides a map of the American psyche: familiar, comfortable faces that walk you through a winding path in the dark woods."

Cinematographer Robert Richardson was a week and a half into shooting City of Hope for John Sayles when he got word that Stone was thinking about making JFK. By the time principal photography wrapped on City of Hope, Richardson was ready to make Stone's film. To prepare, Richardson read up on various JFK assassination books starting with On the Trail of the Assassins and Crossfire: The Plot That Killed Kennedy.

The original idea was to film the opening sequence in 1.33:1 aspect ratio in order to simulate the TV screens that were available at the time of the assassination, then transition to 1.85:1 when Garrison began his investigation, and finally switch to 2.35:1 for scenes occurring in 1968 and later. However, because of time constraints and logistics, Richardson was forced to abandon this approach.

Stone wanted to recreate the Kennedy assassination in Dealey Plaza. His producers had to pay the Dallas City Council a substantial amount of money to hire police to reroute traffic and close streets for three weeks. He only had ten days to shoot all of the footage he needed and so he used seven cameras (two 35 mm and five 16 mm) and 14 film stocks. Getting permission to shoot in the Texas School Book Depository was more difficult. They had to pay $50,000 to put someone in the window from which Oswald was supposed to have shot Kennedy. They were allowed to film in that location only between certain hours with only five people on the floor at one time: the camera crew, an actor and Stone. Co-producer Clayton Townsend has said that the hardest part was getting the permission to restore the building to the way it looked back in 1963. It took five months of negotiation.

The production spent $4 million to restore Dealey Plaza to 1963 conditions. Stone utilized a variety of film stocks. Richardson said, "It depends whether you want to shoot in 35 or 16 or Super 8. In many cases the lighting has to be different." For certain shots in the film, Stone employed multiple camera crews shooting at once, using five cameras at the same time in different formats. Richardson said of Stone's style of direction, "Oliver disdains convention, he tries to force you into things that are not classic. There's this constant need to stretch." This forced the cinematographer to use lighting in diverse positions and rely very little on classic lighting modes. Shooting began on April 15, 1991 and ended on July 31, lasting 78 days with filming finished four-and-a-half months before the release date.

Editing 
JFK marked a fundamental change in the way that Stone constructed his films: a subjective lateral presentation of the plot, with the editing's rhythm carrying the story. Stone brought in Hank Corwin, an editor of commercials, to help edit the film. Stone chose him because his "chaotic mind" was "totally alien to the film form." Stone also commented that Corwin "had not developed the long form yet. And so a lot of his cuts were very chaotic." Stone employed extensive use of flashbacks within flashbacks for a specific effect. He said in an interview:  Because of being shot on various sized film stocks, conventional 35mm film editing was impossible.  Although digital editing was in nascent form, LightWorks and AVID were still not available as editing systems when editing began on JFK.  For that reason, all the footage was transferred to 3/4" videotape and edited on videotape. The 35mm film negative, along with the other sized film stocks were then conformed to match the videotape edit.

Years after its release, Stone said of the film that it "was the beginning of a new era for me in terms of film making because it's not just about a conspiracy to kill John Kennedy. It's also about the way we look at our recent history ... It shifts from black and white to color, and then back again, and views people from offbeat angles."

Music 

Because of his enormous commitment to Steven Spielberg's Hook, which opened the same month as JFK, composer John Williams did not have time to compose a conventional score for the entire film. Instead he composed and conducted six musical sequences in full for JFK before he saw the film in its entirety. Soon after recording this music, he traveled to New Orleans where Stone was still shooting the film and saw approximately an hour's worth of edited footage and dailies. Williams remembers, "I thought his handling of Lee Harvey Oswald was particularly strong, and I understood some of the atmosphere of the film – the sordid elements, the underside of New Orleans." Stone and his team then actually cut the film to fit Williams' music after the composer had scored and recorded musical cues in addition to the six he had done prior to seeing the film. For the motorcade sequence, Williams described the score he composed as "strongly kinetic music, music of interlocking rhythmic disciplines." The composer remembered the moment he learned of Kennedy's assassination and it stuck with him for years. This was a significant factor in his deciding to work on the film. Williams said, "This is a very resonant subject for people of my generation, and that's why I welcomed the opportunity to participate in this film."

Reception

Critical reaction 

On review aggregator Rotten Tomatoes, the film holds an approval rating of 84% based on 68 reviews and an average rating of 7.7/10. The website's critics consensus reads, "As history, Oliver Stone's JFK is dubious, but as filmmaking it's electric, cramming a ton of information and excitement into its three-hour runtime and making great use of its outstanding cast."  On Metacritic, the film has a weighted average of 72 out of 100 based on 29 reviews, indicating "generally favorable reviews". Audiences polled by CinemaScore gave the film an average grade of "A" on an A+ to F scale.

The film's production and release were subject to intense scrutiny and criticism. A few weeks after shooting had begun, on May 14, 1991,  Jon Margolis wrote in the Chicago Tribune that JFK was "an insult to the intelligence." Five days later, The Washington Post ran a scathing article by national security correspondent George Lardner titled, "On the Set: Dallas in Wonderland" that used the first draft of the JFK screenplay to blast it for "the absurdities and palpable untruths in Garrison's book and Stone's rendition of it." The article pointed out that Garrison lost his case against Clay Shaw and that he inflated his case by trying to use Shaw's homosexual relationships to prove guilt by association. Stone responded to Lardner's article by hiring a public relations firm that specialized in political issues. Other critical articles soon followed. Anthony Lewis in The New York Times stated that the film "tells us that our government cannot be trusted to give an honest account of a Presidential assassination." Washington Post columnist George Will called Stone "a man of technical skill, scant education and negligible conscience."

Time ran its own critique of the film-in-progress on June 10, 1991 and alleged that Stone was trying to suppress a rival JFK assassination film based on Don DeLillo's 1988 novel Libra. Stone rebutted these claims in a letter to the magazine.

Richard Corliss, Times film critic, wrote:
Whatever one's suspicions about its use or abuse of the evidence, JFK is a knockout. Part history book, part comic book, the movie rushes toward judgment for three breathless hours, lassoing facts and factoids by the thousands, then bundling them together into an incendiary device that would frag any viewer's complacency. Stone's picture is, in both meanings of the word, sensational: it's tip-top tabloid journalism. In its bravura and breadth, JFK is seditiously enthralling; in its craft, wondrously complex.

The filmmaker ended up splitting his time between making his film, responding to criticism, and conducting a publicity campaign of his own that saw him "omnipresent, from CBS Evening News, to Oprah." However, the Lardner Post piece stung the most because Lardner had stolen a copy of the script. Stone recalls, "He had the first draft, and I went through probably six or seven drafts."

Upon theatrical release, The New York Times ran an article by Bernard Weinraub that called for intervention by the studio: "At what point does a studio exercise its leverage and blunt the highly charged message of a film maker like Oliver Stone?" The newspaper also ran a review of the film by Vincent Canby who wrote, "Mr. Stone's hyperbolic style of film making is familiar: lots of short, often hysterical scenes tumbling one after another, backed by a soundtrack that is layered, strudel-like, with noises, dialogue, music, more noises, more dialogue." Pat Dowell, film critic for The Washingtonian, had her 34-word capsule review for the January issue rejected by her editor John Limpert on the grounds that he did not want the magazine to give a positive review to a film he felt was "preposterous". Dowell resigned in protest.

The Miami Herald said about the controversy in its review, "the focus on the trivialities of personality conveniently prevents us from having to confront the tough questions [Stone's] film raises." Gene Siskel and Roger Ebert both gave the film positive reviews on their television show. Writing for the Chicago Tribune, Siskel called the film "thoroughly compelling" and suggested that while it contained "gross alterations of fact", Stone had "the right to speculate on American history". Ebert praised the film in his review for the Chicago Sun-Times, saying,
 Rita Kempley in The Washington Post wrote, "Quoting everyone from Shakespeare to Hitler to bolster their arguments, Stone and Sklar present a gripping alternative to the Warren Commission's conclusion. A marvelously paranoid thriller featuring a closetful of spies, moles, pro-commies and Cuban freedom-fighters, the whole thing might have been thought up by Robert Ludlum."

On Christmas Day, the Los Angeles Times ran a critical article entitled "Suppression of the Facts Grants Stone a Broad Brush." New York Newsday followed suit the next day with two articles – "The Blurred Vision of JFK" and "The Many Theories of a Jolly Green Giant". A few days later, the Chicago Sun-Times followed suit with "Stone's Film Trashes Facts, Dishonors J.F.K." Jack Valenti, then president and chief executive of the Motion Picture Association of America, denounced Stone's film in a seven-page statement. He wrote: "In much the same way, young German boys and girls in 1941 were mesmerized by Leni Riefenstahl's Triumph of the Will, in which Adolf Hitler was depicted as a newborn God. Both JFK and Triumph of the Will are equally a propaganda masterpiece and equally a hoax. Mr. Stone and Leni Riefenstahl have another genetic linkage: neither of them carried a disclaimer on their film that its contents were mostly pure fiction." Stone recalls in an interview, "I can't even remember all the threats, there were so many of them."

TIME magazine ranked it the fourth best film of 1991, while also including it in "Top 10 Historically Misleading Films" in 2011.

Ebert named Stone's film as the year's best and one of the top ten films of the decade as well as one of The Great Movies. Gene Siskel ranked it the seventh best film of the year. The Sydney Morning Herald named JFK as the best film of 1991. Entertainment Weekly ranked it the 5th Most Controversial Movie Ever.

Ebert's future colleague Richard Roeper was less complimentary: "One can admire Stone's filmmaking skills and the performances here while denouncing the utter crapola presented as 'evidence' of a conspiracy to murder." Roeper applauded the film's "dazzling array of filmmaking techniques and a stellar roster of actors" but criticized Stone's narrative: "As a work of fantastical fiction, JFK is an interesting if overblown vision of a parallel universe. As a dramatic interpretation of events, it's journalistically bankrupt nonsense."

Harry Connick Sr., the New Orleans district attorney who defeated Garrison in 1973, criticized Stone's view of the assassination: "Stone was either unaware of the details and particulars of the Clay Shaw investigation and trial or, if he was aware, that didn't get in his way of what he perceived to be the way the case should have been." In his book Reclaiming History: The Assassination of President John F. Kennedy, a history of the assassination published 16 years after the film's release, Vincent Bugliosi devoted an entire chapter to Garrison's prosecution of Shaw and Stone's subsequent film. Bugliosi lists thirty-two separate "lies and fabrications" in Stone's film and describes the film as "one continuous lie in which Stone couldn't find any level of deception and invention beyond which he was unwilling to go." David R. Wrone stated that "80 percent of the film is in factual error" and rejected the premise of a conspiracy involving the CIA and the so-called military-industrial complex as "irrational". Warren Commission investigator David Belin called the film "a big lie that would make Adolf Hitler proud". Former Indiana Representative Floyd Fithian, who had served on the House Select Committee on Assassinations said the film had manipulated the past. Kennedy's son, John F. Kennedy Jr., refused to watch the film, "because that's not entertainment for me… people, historians, filmmakers…are going to take time and money studying (the assassination).” He cared little about the controversy, stating that regardless of the truth, it would not bring his father back. Clint Hill, a Secret Service agent who was with Kennedy when he was shot, criticized the film, calling it "absurd".

Box-office 
JFK was released in theaters on December 20, 1991. In its first week of release, JFK tied with Beauty and the Beast for fifth place in the U.S. box office and its critics began to say it was a flop. Warner Brothers executives argued that this was at least partly because the film's long running time meant it had had fewer screenings than other films. Box-office picked up momentum, however, in part due to a $15 million marketing campaign from the studio. By the first week in January 1992, it had grossed over $50 million worldwide, eventually earning over $200 million worldwide and $70 million in the United States during its initial run.

Garrison's estate subsequently sued Warner Bros. for a share of the film's profits, alleging fraud perpetrated through a book-keeping practice known as "Hollywood accounting." The lawsuit contended that JFK made in excess of $150 million worldwide but the studio claimed that, under its "net profits" accounting formula, the film earned no money, and that Garrison's estate did not receive any of the more than $1 million net profits income he was due.

Awards and nominations 

Upon winning the Golden Globe Award for Best Director – Motion Picture, Stone said in his acceptance speech: A terrible lie was told to us 28 years ago. I hope that this film can be the first step in righting that wrong.

Entertainment Weekly ranked JFK as one of the 25 "Powerful Political Thrillers". In 2012, the Motion Picture Editors Guild listed the film as the ninth best-edited film of all time based on a survey of its membership.

Legislative impact 

The final report of the Assassination Records Review Board (ARRB) partially credited concern over the conclusions in JFK with the passage of the President John F. Kennedy Assassination Records Collection Act of 1992, also known as the JFK Act.

The ARRB stated that the film "popularized a version of President Kennedy's assassination that featured U.S. government agents from the Federal Bureau of Investigation (FBI), the Central Intelligence Agency (CIA), and the military as conspirators." While describing the film as "largely fictional", the ARRB acknowledged Stone's point that official records were to be sealed from the public until 2029, and his suggestion that "Americans could not trust official public conclusions when those conclusions had been made in secret." By ARRB law, all existing assassination-related documents were to be made public by 2017, and most are now released.

Home media and alternate versions 
The original theatrical cut of JFK was released on VHS and Laserdisc on May 20, 1992. The "Director's Cut" of the film, extending it to 206 minutes, was released on VHS and laserdisc in 1993. The Director's Cut was released on DVD in 1997. The theatrical cut has not been released on physical media in the US since the 1992 laserdisc, although it has been released on both DVD and Blu-ray internationally. As of 2018, the theatrical cut and the director's cut are both available for digital download and streaming in the United States.

On January 16, 2001, the Director's Cut was re-released on DVD as part of the Oliver Stone Collection box-set, with the film on one disc and supplemental material on the second. Stone contributed several extras to this edition, including an audio commentary, two multimedia essays, and 54 minutes' worth of deleted/extended scenes with optional commentary by Stone.

On November 11, 2003, a "Special Edition" DVD of the Director's Cut was released with the film on one disc and all of the extras from the 2001 edition on a second disc, in addition to a 90-minute documentary entitled, Beyond JFK: The Question of Conspiracy.

The Director's Cut was released on Blu-ray on November 11, 2008. The disc features many of the extras included on the previous DVD releases, including the Beyond JFK: The Question of Conspiracy documentary.

In popular culture
Seinfeld spoofed the film in the 1992 episode "The Boyfriend".

The "back and to the left" scene was parodied on an episode on the cult animated sitcom The Critic.

The film is referenced twice in the 90s sitcom Family Matters by Waldo Faldo, who pronounces the name literally.  During a date with Laura Winslow, he says "We should've seen 'Jifkuh'."  When Laura corrects him with "Oh you mean JFK.", he responds "I know how it's spelled!"  The second time was following his date with Maxine, where the movie choices were either Malcolm X (which he believes stood for the Roman numeral 10) or "Jifkuh".

The film was used for Stan Dane’s book Prayer Man: The Exoneration of Lee Harvey Oswald to have high quality frames of the James Darnell film to support a theory that a man standing on the Depository front steps during the assassination, referred to as "prayer man", is Oswald.

See also 

 Assassination of John F. Kennedy in popular culture
 Cultural depictions of John F. Kennedy

References

Bibliography 
 Riordan, James (September 1996) Stone: A Biography of Oliver Stone. New York: Aurum Press. 
 Salewicz, Chris (February 1998) Oliver Stone: Close Up: The Making of His Movies. Thunder's Mouth Press. 
 Stone, Oliver (February 2000) JFK: The Book of the Film. New York: Applause Books.

Further reading 
 
 
 
 Robert Brent Toplin (1996). History by Hollywood "JFK: Fact, Fiction, and Supposition," pp. 45–78. University of Illinois Press.

External links 

 
 
 
 
 
 JFK (motion picture): A Selective Bibliography of Materials in the UC Berkeley Library
 The JFK 100: One Hundred Errors of Fact and Judgment in Oliver Stone's JFK, by Dave Reitzes
 The Assassination Goes Hollywood! (concise overview of frequent criticisms)
 "Why they hate Oliver Stone", Sam Smith, Progressive Review, February 1992

1991 films
1991 controversies
1990s historical films
1990s political drama films
1990s thriller drama films
American historical films
American political drama films
American political thriller films
BAFTA winners (films)
1990s English-language films
Cold War films
Films scored by John Williams
Films based on non-fiction books
Films about conspiracy theories
Films about presidents of the United States
Films about the assassination of John F. Kennedy
Films based on multiple works
Films directed by Oliver Stone
Films produced by Oliver Stone
Films set in Dallas
Films set in New Orleans
Films set in 1963
Films set in 1966
Films set in 1969
Films set in Washington, D.C.
Films shot in Dallas
Films shot in New Orleans
Films shot in Virginia
Films shot in Washington, D.C.
Films partially in color
Films whose cinematographer won the Best Cinematography Academy Award
Films whose director won the Best Director Golden Globe
Films whose editor won the Best Film Editing Academy Award
Regency Enterprises films
Films with screenplays by Oliver Stone
Historical mystery films
StudioCanal films
Vietnam War films
Warner Bros. films
Cultural depictions of John F. Kennedy
Cultural depictions of Lee Harvey Oswald
Cultural depictions of Jack Ruby
Films set in the 1960s
1990s American films